is a subprefecture of Kagoshima Prefecture, Japan. The subprefectural office is located in Amami.

It includes the following municipalities on the Amami Islands:

Ōshima Subprefecture
Amami (city on Amami Ōshima)
Tatsugō (town on Amami Ōshima)
Yamato (village on Amami Ōshima)
Setouchi Office
Uken (village on Amami Ōshima)
Setouchi (town on Amami Ōshima, Kakeromajima, Yoroshima, Ukejima, and others)
Kikai Office
Kikai (town on Kikaijima)
Tokunoshima Office
Tokunoshima (town on Tokunoshima)
Amagi (town on Tokunoshima)
Isen (town on Tokunoshima)
Okinoerabu Office
Wadomari (town on Okinoerabujima)
China (town on Okinoerabujima)
Yoron (town on Yoronjima)

Offices 
 Ōshima Subprefecture: 17-3 Naze Nagatachō, Amami-shi, Kagoshima-ken. 894-8501
 Setouchi Office: 36 Koniya Funatsu, Setouchi-chō, Kagoshima-ken. 894-1506
 Kikai Office: 2901-14 Akaren, Kikai-chō, Kagoshima-ken. 891-6201
 Tokunoshima Office: 216 Kametsu, Tokunoshima-chō, Kagoshima-ken. 891-7101
 Okinoerabu Office: 134-1 Tedechina, Wadomari-chō, Kagoshima-ken. 891-9111
 Okinoerabu Office Yoron Town Resident Office: 1420-2 Chabana, Yoron-chō, Kagoshima-ken. 891-9301

External links 
  Official website
 

Oshima Subprefecture (Kagoshima)